Franck Saunier (born 14 February 1966) is a French ice hockey player. He competed in the men's tournament at the 1994 Winter Olympics.

References

1966 births
Living people
Olympic ice hockey players of France
Ice hockey players at the 1994 Winter Olympics
People from Gap, Hautes-Alpes
Sportspeople from Hautes-Alpes